Fernando Domingo Rodríguez (born June 2, 1976 in Morón (Buenos Aires), Argentina) is a former Argentine footballer.

Teams
  Ferrocarril Midland 1993-1997
  Deportivo Morón 1998-1999
  Platense 1999-2001
  Deportes Concepción 2001-2002
  El Porvenir 2002
  Cobresal 2003
  Olmedo 2004-2005
  Al-Ahli 2006
  Universidad Católica 2007
  Juan Aurich 2008
  Sportivo Italiano 2008-2009
  Gimnasia y Tiro de Salta 2009
  Argentino de Merlo 2010–2014

External links
 
 Fernando Rodríguez at playmakerstats.com (English version of ceroacero.es)
 

1976 births
Living people
Argentine footballers
Argentine expatriate footballers
Gimnasia y Tiro footballers
Club Atlético Platense footballers
Deportivo Morón footballers
Sportivo Italiano footballers
El Porvenir footballers
C.D. Olmedo footballers
C.D. Universidad Católica del Ecuador footballers
Juan Aurich footballers
Cobresal footballers
Deportes Concepción (Chile) footballers
Chilean Primera División players
Expatriate footballers in Chile
Expatriate footballers in Peru
Expatriate footballers in Ecuador
Expatriate footballers in the United Arab Emirates
Argentine expatriate sportspeople in the United Arab Emirates
Argentino de Merlo footballers
Association football forwards
People from Morón Partido
Sportspeople from Buenos Aires Province